Bruno Bini (born 1 October 1954) is a former French football manager who formerly managed the French women's national team.
Under his charge, his team finished in fourth position in both the 2011 FIFA Women's World Cup and 2012 Summer Olympics.

In 2015, he became Chinese women's national team coach.

References

External links
 FFF Profile
 Interview avec Stéphane Poignard sur Blogde2foot

Living people
1954 births
Footballers from Orléans
French footballers
Association football midfielders
Pays d'Aix FC players
Tours FC players
AS Nancy Lorraine players
Ligue 1 players
French football managers
France women's national football team managers
China women's national football team managers
2011 FIFA Women's World Cup managers
French expatriate football managers
French expatriate sportspeople in China
Expatriate football managers in China